Ishtup-Ishar (Ištup-Išar) was a king (Lugal) of the second Mariote kingdom who reigned c. 2400 BC. The king's name was traditionally read as Išhtup-šar, with šar being a common divine element in personal names attested in the region. However, the king's name is read as Ishtup-Ishar by Alfonso Archi, Ishar being an important justice deity worshiped in Mari and Ebla.

In a letter written by the later Mariote king Enna-Dagan, Ishar is attested conquering and destroying the Eblaite cities of Lalanium and Emar.

See also
Eblaite-Mariote war

Citations

24th-century BC rulers
Kings of Mari
24th-century BC people